Saiyid Nurul Hasan (26 December 1921 – 12 July 1993) was an Indian historian and an elder statesman in the Government of India. A member of the Rajya Sabha, he was the Union Minister of State (with Independent Charges) of Education, Social Welfare and Culture Government of India (1971–1977) and the Governor of West Bengal and Odisha (1986–1993).

Background and education

Hasan was born in Lucknow, India. He belonged to a taluqdari (madad-i ma'ash) family of the United Provinces. He was the son of Saiyid Abdul Hasan and Nur Fatima Begum, and his name was devised by combining the names of his parents. His father was a district settlement officer and later president of the Court of Wards in the United Provinces. His maternal grandfather was Sir Syed Wazir Hasan, chief justice of the Court of Oudh and a well known president of the Muslim League, who had called for Hindu-Muslim unity in 1936. His maternal uncles were Syed Sajjad Zaheer, a barrister and an eminent Marxist thinker and Syed Ali Zaheer, a barrister who became the law minister of Uttar Pradesh and India's ambassador to Iran.

Hasan attended the Sultan ul Madaris, Lucknow. Then he went to the La Martiniere Boys' College in Kolkata,. He completed his graduation from Muir Central College, Allahabad, where he was a student of Professor R.P. Tripathi. Later he went to New College, Oxford, where he completed an M.A. and D.Phil. in Indian history. In Oxford, he was president of the Oxford India Majlis.

At a young age, Hasan was married to Nawabzadi Khurshid Laqa Begum Sahiba, eldest daughter of Nawab Raza Ali Khan of Rampur, in a match arranged by their families in the usual Indian way. At that time, Khurshid Laqa's father was the ruler of Rampur, a major, 15 Gun Salute Princely state located not far from Delhi, and surrounded by the United Provinces. The present Nawab, Kazim Ali Khan, is a nephew of Khurshid Laqa. Nurul Hasan and Khurshid Laqa had a harmonious marriage which lasted all their lives, and were blessed with two children, a son named Sayyid Sirajul Hasan, an eminent physicist who retired as director of the Indian Institute of Astrophysics, Bangalore, and a daughter, Sayyida Talat Fatima Hasan, who is a successful entrepreneur based in the USA.

Career

Academic

He began his academic career as a lecturer in history at the School of Oriental and African Studies, London. He was appointed professor in the Department of History at Aligarh Muslim University, of which he was a chairperson as well. He contributed greatly to the growth of the history department in Aligarh in its initial years. Later he became the general secretary and then the president of the Indian History Congress. He was a Fellow of the Royal Historical Society and the Royal Asiatic Society in London.

Political

A secularist with an abiding faith in leftism, Hasan was a member of the Rajya Sabha from 1969 to 1978. From 1971 to 1977, he was the Union Minister of State (with independent charge) for Education, Social Welfare & Culture in the Government of India. As India's education minister, he founded the Indian Council of Historical Research, New Delhi. He was also the architect behind the setting up of 27 social science research institutes in India under the aegis of the Indian Council of Social Science Research (ICSSR), New Delhi, such as the Centre for Studies in Social Sciences, Calcutta (1973). When he was a minister, under an act of the parliament, the funding and management of the Rampur Raza Library was given to the Government of India. From 1977 to 1980 he was Vice President of the Council of Scientific and Industrial Research (CSIR), New Delhi.

He was instrumental in improving the career advancement scheme of many leftist college and university teachers in India, impacting political neutrality of education. He was also instrumental in starting the 10+2+3 system of education at the High School, Junior College and undergraduate levels. He played a major role in tabling "Towards Equality: The Report of the Committee on the Status of Women in India (1974-5)" in parliament, which was submitted by a committee appointed by the Government of India. The findings of this report formed the basis for the establishment of the Centre for Women's Development Studies, Delhi. He served as Ambassador of India to the Soviet Union from 1983 to 1986. He was the Governor of West Bengal from 1986 to 1989 and then again from 1989 to 1993. He was the Governor of Odisha in 1989. As the Governor of West Bengal, he founded the Maulana Abul Kalam Azad Institute of Asian Studies, Calcutta (1993). He was the first President of the institute's Society.

Death
He died of renal failure in Calcutta, West Bengal in 1993, aged 71, while continuing in office as the Governor.

Legacy
The Nurul Hasan Education Foundation is named after him. The Nurul Hasan Chair Professorship of the Department of History of the University of Calcutta is named after him.

Publications
Religion, State, and Society in Medieval India : Collected Works of S. Nurul Hasan (Satish Chandra, editor). New Delhi : Oxford University Press, 2005. - viii, 335 S. : Kt.  / 978-019566765-3
Sufis, Sultans and Feudal Orders : Professor Nurul Hasan Commemoration Volume (Mansura Haidar, editor), 2004.
 Studies in archaeology and history: commemoration volume of Prof. S. Nurul Hasan, Publisher: Rampur Raza Library, 2003. .

See also
•Prof Syed Nurul Hasan College

References

1921 births
1993 deaths
20th-century Indian historians
Academic staff of Aligarh Muslim University
University of Allahabad alumni
Alumni of New College, Oxford
Ambassadors of India to the Soviet Union
Education Ministers of India
Deaths from kidney failure
Fellows of the Royal Asiatic Society
Fellows of the Royal Historical Society
Governors of Odisha
20th-century Indian Muslims
Governors of West Bengal
Historians of South Asia
Indian Marxist historians
Indian political writers
Indian Shia Muslims
La Martiniere Calcutta alumni
Nominated members of the Rajya Sabha
Politicians from Lucknow
Rajya Sabha members from Uttar Pradesh
Writers from Lucknow
20th-century Indian politicians